For information on all Lamar University sports, see Lamar Cardinals and Lady Cardinals

The 2016–17 Lamar Cardinals basketball team represented Lamar University during the 2016–17 NCAA Division I men's basketball season. The Cardinals were led by third-year head coach Tic Price and played their home games at the Montagne Center in Beaumont, Texas as members of the Southland Conference. They finished the season 19–15, 10–8 in Southland play to finish in a tie for fifth place. They defeated Southeastern Louisiana in the first round of the Southland tournament to advance to the quarterfinals where they lost to Stephen F. Austin. They were invited to the CollegeInsider.com Tournament where they lost in the first round to Texas State.

Previous season
The Cardinals finished the 2015–16 season 11–19. 3–15 in Southland play to finish in last place. As a result, they failed to qualify for the Southland tournament.

Media 
All 2016–17 Lamar Cardinals home games, except those otherwise contracted for, will be broadcast online live on ESPN3. Games will be broadcast over the radio by KLVI AM 560 radio with audio streaming over iheart radio.

Offseason

Departures 
Lamar head coach, Tic Price, announced on March 17, 2016 that sophomore point guard Kevin Booze, freshman forward Boaz Williams, and junior center Christian Kennedy were leaving the team. Assistant coach Anthony Anderson resigned in April, 2016.

Additions
On June 2, 2016, Lamar University announced hiring Justin Bailey as assistant coach. Bailey had been an assistant at Arkansas–Fort Smith for four years and was a graduate assistant at Arizona State.

Roster

Schedule and results

|-
!colspan=12 style=| Non-conference regular season

|-
!colspan=12 style=| Southland Conference regular season

|-
!colspan=12 style=| Southland tournament

|-
!colspan=12 style=| CIT

See also
2016–17 Lamar Lady Cardinals basketball team

References

Lamar Cardinals basketball seasons
Lamar
Lamar
Lamar Cardinals basketball
Lamar Cardinals basketball